Chala Change Ka Chakkar is an Indian reality show, which began airing on 23 March 2008 on STAR Plus channel. The show was hosted by Shruti Seth and produced by Jainardhan Sathyan

Concept
Chala Change Ka Chakkar was essentially a role switching show. Contestants are selected to spend a day in the life of a participating celebrity; the celebrity, in turn, lives like the contestant.

Celebrities
Mahendra Singh Dhoni -Fast Play 30 March
Saif Ali Khan - 6 April 
Juhi Chawla - 23 March

Indian television series
StarPlus original programming
2008 Indian television series debuts
2008 Indian television series endings